St. Luke's Episcopal Church, also known as The Rock Church, is a historic Episcopal church located at 604 Morgan Road in Eden, Rockingham County, North Carolina.  It was built in 1926, and is a one-story Mission Gothic style solid masonry church. It has a gabled roof that is intersected by gabled transepts and a pointed arch tracery stained glass window. A stained-glass window at St. Luke's was given by Lily Morehead Mebane in memory of her mother, Mary Lily Connally Morehead. It features a three-stage crenellated corner tower.

It was added to the National Register of Historic Places in 1989.

References

Churches completed in 1926
20th-century Episcopal church buildings
Episcopal church buildings in North Carolina
Churches on the National Register of Historic Places in North Carolina
Gothic Revival church buildings in North Carolina
Churches in Rockingham County, North Carolina
National Register of Historic Places in Rockingham County, North Carolina